Beadle's About is a British television programme hosted by Jeremy Beadle, where members of the public became victims of practical jokes behind hidden cameras. It was produced by LWT for ITV, and ran on Saturday nights from 22 November 1986 to 14 September 1996.

Format
An example of one of the practical jokes would involve someone's car or van secretly being swapped for an identical one, and then, having a disaster befall it, such as exploding, falling into the sea, or being dropped from a great height, as the owner of the vehicle looked on in horror. After a few minutes, Beadle would appear in disguise (typically, as a policeman or some other figure of authority, and often wearing a fake beard on top of his natural beard), and interact with the shell-shocked and/or irate victim. He would subtly drop more and more hints and would remove his disguise and point a stick microphone at the person. As the public were familiar with Beadle from the earlier show Game for a Laugh, they would then immediately realise they had been had, often with the words "I don't believe it!". A follow up series was entitled 'It's Beadle!' which followed a similar format.

Memorable pranks
One of the most notable pranks was where Dorset resident Janet Elford was convinced into believing that aliens had landed in her garden. Members of the public were set up by a resident team of Beadle's About actors including: Pam Cole, Ricky Diamond, Tony McHale, Nicholas Young and Flavia Brilli.

Popularity
At its peak, the show attracted approximately 15 million viewers, making it one of ITV's most popular Saturday night programmes during that period. After the show was axed by ITV in 1996, Beadle's About was repeated on Granada Plus in the late 1990's, the show was then repeated in full on Challenge TV throughout the 2000's, although Challenge (and sister channels Ftn and Virgin 1) sometimes aired certain Beadle's About sketches (under the banner The Best of Beadle's About) as programming fillers whenever the channel had allocated time to fill after programmes finished early, Beadle's About then wasn't repeated in full on national TV for over a decade afterwards, until That's TV announced in December 2021 that the programme would feature in its Christmas schedule alongside other ITV programmes like The Benny Hill Show and Kenny Everett's New Year Specials.

Profanity bubble
The "Bleep!" or "Oops!" bubble used to block out offensive language was a well known feature from the show. The bubbles were simply clouds with either "Bleep!" or "Oops!" in them, the text being set in Balloon typeface. These were also used to cover up offensive hand gestures as well.

Jeremy once revealed in an interview that during editing, they deliberately inserted "bleeps" where there were no profanities as this made it funnier.

Transmissions

Series

Highlights Specials

DVD releases
The first two series of Beadle's About have been released on DVD by Network.

References

External links

1980s British comedy television series
1990s British comedy television series
1986 British television series debuts
1996 British television series endings
Hidden camera television series
ITV comedy
English-language television shows
London Weekend Television shows
Television series by ITV Studios